The Matthean Posteriority hypothesis, also known as the Wilke hypothesis after Christian Gottlob Wilke, is a proposed solution to the synoptic problem, holding that the Gospel of Mark was used as a source by the Gospel of Luke, then both of these were used as sources by the Gospel of Matthew. Thus, it posits Marcan priority and Matthaean posteriority.

History

Gottlob Christian Storr, in his groundbreaking 1786 argument for Marcan priority, asked, if Mark was a source for Matthew and Luke, how the latter two were then related. Storr proposed, among other possibilities, that canonical Greek Matthew was adapted from an earlier Aramaic Matthew (the logia spoken of by Papias) by following Mark primarily but also drawing from Luke, although he later went on to oppose this.

These ideas were little noticed until 1838, when Christian Gottlob Wilke revived the hypothesis of Marcan priority and extensively developed the argument for Matthaean posteriority. Wilke's contemporary Christian Hermann Weisse at the same time independently argued for Marcan priority but for Matthew and Luke independently using Mark and another source Q—the two-source hypothesis. A few other German scholars supported Wilke's hypothesis in the nineteenth century, but in time most came to accept the two-source hypothesis, which remains the dominant theory to this day. Wilke's hypothesis was accepted by Karl Kautsky in his Foundations of Christianity.

Wilke's hypothesis received little further attention until recent decades, when it was revived in 1992 by Huggins, then Hengel, then independently by Blair. Additional recent supporters include Garrow and Powell.

Evidence

Most arguments for the Wilke hypothesis follow those of the Farrer hypothesis in accepting Marcan priority but rejecting Q. The difference, then, is in the direction of dependence between Matthew and Luke.

Arguments advanced in favor of Matthaean posteriority include:

 Matthew's version of the double tradition appears more developed in wording and structure than Luke's, which appears more primitive. (The same observation is made by supporters of the two-source hypothesis, who regard Luke adhering better to the original Q.)
 Matthew contains passages that are conflations of elements drawn from Mark and Luke (e.g. Matt 9:14-17, 9:35-10,12:22-30, 12:31-32, 19:23-30, 24:23-28). This phenomenon is unique to Matthew, for there is no similar array of passages in Luke that are composed of elements drawn from Mark and Matthew.
 Matthew seems to have deliberately rearranged his sources to collecting teachings into five large blocks (e.g., the Sermon on the Mount), which makes better sense than Luke rearranging Matthew into scattered fragments.
 In the double tradition, Matthew's language often retains characteristically Lucan features.
 The frequent occurrence of doublets in Matthew may indicate drawing from similar accounts in two different sources.

See also

 Synoptic Gospels
 Two-source hypothesis
 Farrer hypothesis

References

External links
 The Synoptic Problem and the Non-existence of Q, by Evan Powell
 Matthew Conflator Hypothesis, by Alan Garrow

Synoptic problem
Hypotheses